Sebastian Krys (born November 11, 1970) is an Argentine-born American audio engineer, record producer and radio personality. A six-time Grammy and 13-time Latin Grammy winner, Krys has worked with many Spanish language pop and rock artists such as Percance, Sergio Dalma, Eros Ramazzotti, Sandy & Junior, Gloria Estefan, Carlos Vives, Shakira, Alejandro Sanz, Luis Fonsi, Vega, Kinky, Los Rabanes, Obie Bermúdez, Ricky Martin, Marc Anthony, Lori Meyers, Fangoria, La Santa Cecilia and Will Smith.

Personal
Sebastian Krys (pronounced "Chris") was born in Buenos Aires, Argentina and arrived in the United States of America in 1980 at the age of nine as an undocumented immigrant.  Krys became a U.S. citizen in 2012. He Lives with his wife Pamela Krys, and sons Nick and Gabe Krys.

Career
Krys started in 1992 as a recording intern at the legendary Emilio Estefan's Crescent Moon Studio in Miami, where he worked until the early 2000s. There he worked with major Latin artists such as Roberto Blades, Celia Cruz, Enrique Iglesias, David Bisbal, Ricky Martin, Arturo Sandoval, Jon Secada and, of course, Gloria Estefan.

In 2010, after moving to Los Angeles, Sebastian launched an independent music company called Rebeleon Entertainment.

Selected discography

Awards and nominations
As a producer and mixer he won seven American Grammys and ten Latin Grammys. He's currently in the fourth spot as the Most Latin Grammys won by a Producer third as Most Latin Grammys won by an Engineer or Mixer, and sixth as Most Latin Grammys won in a lifetime. In 2007 Sebastian Krys was awarded the Producer of the Year. at the 8th Latin Grammy Awards In 2009 he was inducted to the Full Sail University Hall of Fame.

Grammy Awards

Latin Grammy Awards

References

1970 births
American audio engineers
American people of Argentine-Jewish descent
American record producers
Argentine emigrants to the United States
Argentine Jews
Grammy Award winners
Living people
Jewish American musicians
Jewish Argentine musicians
Latin Grammy Award for Producer of the Year
Latin music record producers
21st-century American Jews